The Garie Formation is a narrow band of sedimentary rocks occurring in the Sydney Basin in eastern Australia. This stratum is up to 8 metres thick, situated below the sandstones of the Newport Formation. Formed in the mid-Triassic, it is part of the Narrabeen Group of sedimentary rocks. Garie formation consists of layers of clay pellet sandstone, dark lithic particles, spotted volcanic deposits and chocolate coloured claystone bands.

See also
 Sydney Basin
 Bald Hill Claystone
 Bulgo Sandstone
 Narrabeen group

References

Geologic formations of Australia
Triassic Australia
Sandstone formations
Shale formations
Geology of New South Wales